The following highways are numbered 17C:

United States
 Nebraska Link 17C
 New York State Route 17C

See also
List of highways numbered 17